
Scorpion Mountain is a mountain in the U.S state of Washington located in Snohomish County near Skykomish.

Hazards 

The trail is a ridge trail with steep slopes on either side.

Recreation 
The summit affords a 360 degree view of the area, which includes Glacier Peak to the North.

See also 
 List of mountain peaks of North America
 List of mountain peaks of the United States
 Beckler Peak

References 

Cascade Range
Mountains of Washington (state)
Mountains of Snohomish County, Washington